Edmundo Galdino da Silva (Araguaína, 28 October 1958 – Araguaína, 22 April 2021) was a Brazilian politician who served as a Goiás MLA and later as a  National Deputy from 2002 till 2006 and 1989 to 1995.

Da Silva died of heart and kidney failure on 22 April 2021, in Araguaína.

References

1958 births
2021 deaths
Tocantins politicians
Members of the Legislative Assembly of Goiás
Members of the Chamber of Deputies (Brazil) from Goiás
Brazilian Democratic Movement politicians
Brazilian Social Democracy Party politicians
Cidadania politicians
Democratic Labour Party (Brazil) politicians
Federal University of Goiás alumni